BikingMan is a French-based organization that organises unstaged, self-supported, ultra distance cycling events, in South America, Europe, the Middle East and Asia.  It was founded in 2016 by Axel Carion, who came back from cycling across South America in 2015 and wanted to share the experience of cycling unknown places in survival conditions for endurance athletes.

Self-supported ultra cycling 
The self-supported nature of the BikingMan races makes it different from supported ultra-distance events like the Race Across America (RAAM), in which each racer has a large support crew with multiple vehicles and where pure performance cycling is needed to finish these races. The carbon footprint of the races are kept to a minimum, support cars outside BikingMan organizations media cars, are strictly forbidden.

Being self-supported means that drafting is not allowed, receiving any form of support from other racers, friends, or family is not allowed; all food, accommodation, repairs, etc., must be purchased from commercial sources if they can find any on the road. The organizer provides a mandatory route, a GPS tracker to control the progression of every participant and potential cheating and a road book. Riders must strategically choose how much time to devote to riding, resting, and refueling each day.

It is not a stage race, the clock never stops from the moment the riders leave the start to the moment that they reach the finish. Orienteering plays a major role as most of the races' locations are unknown to most participants.

Rules of BikingMan races 
The complete rule set is available in the race manual of every race.
 Athletes are self-supported and need to handle their fueling, repairs and rest during the race
 All athletes must ride from the start location to the finish location while crossing the mandatory checkpoints in the right order
 Every athlete needs to stamp her/his progression at every staffed checkpoint in the opening time windows 
 Drafting and riding as a pack are forbidden
 Every athlete needs to carry a GPS tracking system to trace her/his progression
 External assistance of any kind is forbidden
 No support cars are allowed
 SOLO or pair riders can attempt the races

How to follow the race 
BikingMan events are all covered by a limited number of media cars from the organization. The events are therefore presented live on social networks, namely the Instagram and Facebook accounts of the organization.
During races, and on a daily basis, a story-based article is published on the Exposure page of the organization, as well as an additional article for the leaderboard once the race is completed.
All participants are equipped with a GPS tracker, which allows to share their position on a live-tracking website.

Season 2017 
In 2017 was held the first BikingMan event; the IncaDivide race, which took 17 athletes in the Andes mountains of Ecuador and Peru. A brutal race where the main challenge for every racer was to battled against high altitude cycling conditions of the Andes.

Calendar of the races

Results

Season 2018 
In 2018, BikingMan introduced the 1st ultra cycling championship which gathered athletes from around the globe to race the Hajar mountains of Oman, across the Andes Cordillera of Peru with IncaDivide race, around Corsica and in Taiwan. 

On the "Sprint" BikingMan 2018 races (Oman and Corsica), base camps were built at the checkpoints where athletes could rest. Compulsory stops at staffed checkpoints ensure athletes timestamp their progression, validate their physical state and eventually scratch the athletes who don't respect the closing times of every checkpoint.

Calendar of the races

Results

2018 Championship ranking 
Participants enter the season ranking once they have completed, as finishers, 2 BikingMan series races.

Season 2019 
The 2019 season introduced 2 new events: Laos in May, and Portugal in September, bringing the series to a total of 6 events, all parts of the 2019 championship.

Calendar of the races

Results

2019 Series Ranking 
Final 2019 Rankings after the race in Taiwan - as of November 15, 2019.

Participants enter the season ranking once they have completed, as finishers, 2 BikingMan races

Season 2020 
The 2020 season will be composed of 6 events with new routes unveiled on Oman, Corsica, Peru and Laos. Brazil will be part of the series for its first time. The crown jewel event incadivide will unveil a course in the sacred valley of the Incas around Cusco city.

Impact of the COVID-19 Pandemic 

Following the global pandemic and many locked-down countries, the race calendar has been modified by the race organisation to adapt to the situation  with the races in Brazil, Peru and Laos canceled, while the 2020 edition of BikingMan Corsica, initially scheduled for April 2020, is planned for October 2020.
The 2020 series will therefore be composed of 3 events out of the 6 initially planned.

Calendar of the races

Results

Season 2021 
The 2021 season has been announced with 7 events focusing mostly on Europe (4 events in France + Portugal) + Brazil and Oman. Brazil will be part of the series for its first time after the canceled 2020 edition.

Calendar of the races

References

Links 
 (en) official site
 (en) calendar of the BikingMan races
 (en) BikingMan Instagram channel
 (en) Instagram channel of the IncaDivide race
 (en) official Facebook page
 (en) Facebook page of the IncaDivide race
 (en) Blog of Rob Packham, participant
 (fr) Blog of Xavier Massart, participant
 (pt) Blog of Vinicius Martin, participant

2016 establishments in France
Cycling organizations in France